Line 18 of the Chengdu Metro is an express rapid transit line that connects the urban area of Chengdu with Chengdu Tianfu International Airport. Line 18's color is teal. The Phase 1 & 2 of Line 18 is in total 69.39 km in length. It is also the biggest PPP project in China. The section from South Railway Station to Tianfu International Airport North Station started operation on 18 December 2020. 

Between Chengdu South Railway Station and Western China International Expo City Station, the line runs adjacent to Line 1 essentially forming a four track subway. Line 18 runs express between the two stations, skipping a number of stops that Line 1 makes. The four track alignment with Line 1 will be extended to North Railway Station once Phase 3 of the line is completed.

Description

Phase 1 & 2
Phase 1 and 2 of the line, which is currently in operation, start at Chengdu South Railway Station and end at Chengdu Tianfu International Airport.

The line officially started construction on August 16, 2016. The section from South Railway Station to Sancha started operation on 27 September 2020. The line will use 8-car Type A rolling stock. The rolling stock have features designed for medium distance travel, such as a 140 km/h maximum speed and wide station spacing. 

The line will also feature distinct express and local services using passing tracks at select stations with an express service stopping only at 4 intermediate stations, and planned to complete a trip between Chengdu South Railway Station to Chengdu Tianfu International Airport in 35 minutes. The local service will stop at all stations on Line 18 and will complete the trip in 40 to 50 minutes.

Phase 3 

On December 9, 2019, the Department of Ecology and Environment of Sichuan Province approved new extensions for Line 18. Line 18 Phase 3 includes North Extension, Linjiang Section, and South Extension. It is 16.715 kilometers long, all underground. In total, 6 underground stations (4 transfer stations), 1 reserved station, and 1 new depot will be built.

North Section 
The length of the extension is 10.985 kilometers with 4 new stations.

South Section 

Line 18 is also planned to extend south beyond Tianfu International Airport Terminals 1 & 2 Station to Guanyan, adding 5.75 kilometers and 2 new underground stations and Linjiang Depot. On June 18, 2020, Government of Chengdu changed the name of Linjiang Station to Guanyan Station.

Phase 4 

Jianyang Housing and Urban Planning Bureau officially released the plan for Line 18 Phase 4 to be extended to Jianyang South Railway Station.

Additionally, Line 18 will connect with the proposed Line S3 (Ziyang line) at Futian Station. Line S3 (Ziyang line) is currently undergoing geological investigation in central Ziyang.

History 

 On July 11, 2016, the NDRC approved the third phase of expansion for the Chengdu Metro, which includes Line 18.

 On August 16, 2016, Line 18 started construction.

 On February 28, 2017, first tunnel machine started tunneling.

 On June 27, 2017, Sichuan Development and Reform Commission approved phase 2.

 On August 18, 2017, the first station: Xinglong Station finished roofing and construction.

 On October 24, 2018, Futian - T3/T4 section finished tunnel construction.

 On January 29, 2019, Phase 1 and Phase 2 finished viaduct construction.
 On May 31, 2019, the first tunnel section was completed.

 On June 2, 2019, all tunnels in Phase 1 and Phase 2 are connected.

 On June 13, 2019, Line 18's first train started testing in Chengdu.

 On June 1, 2020, systems testing and debugging began.

 On June 2, 2020, Line 18, the biggest PPP project in China, started its 3-month trial operation in preparation for opening. 

 On August 6, 2020, Line 18 completed fire-prevention assessment.

 On September 27, 2020, the first and second section (from South Railway Station to Sancha) of Line 18 was opened.

 On June 27, 2021, an infill station,  station opened with Chengdu Tianfu International Airport.

Stations

See also
 Chengdu Metro
 Chengdu Tianfu International Airport
 Urban rail transit in China
 Jianyang

References

Chengdu Metro lines
Railway lines opened in 2020
2020 establishments in China
Airport rail links in China